The 1963–64 Alpha Ethniki was the 28th season of the highest football league of Greece.  The season began on 14 September 1963 and ended on 14 June 1964 with the relegation play-off match. Panathinaikos won their seventh Greek title.

The point system was: Win: 3 points - Draw: 2 points - Loss: 1 point.

League table

Results

Top scorers

External links
Rec.Sport.Soccer Statistics Foundation

Alpha Ethniki seasons
Greece
1963–64 in Greek football leagues